Norwich Victoria was a railway station in Norwich in Norfolk and the former terminus of the Great Eastern Main Line. There were at one time three railway stations in Norwich, the others being Norwich City and Norwich Thorpe. Currently, only the former Thorpe station, now known simply as "Norwich", remains in use.

Opening
The station was opened by the Eastern Union Railway (EUR), with regular passenger services commencing on 12 December 1849. The booking hall of the station had once housed a circus which formed an entertainment centre known as Ranelagh Gardens. The circus on the site had been operated by a Spanish-sounding gentleman named Pablo Fanque (in reality a Mr Darby from Norwich) and when the EUR purchased the site they then sold the various circus fittings.

The station had two platforms arranged in a V-shape, with the V at the south end and the rotunda (or pantheon) containing the ticket office at the north end. A small garden was located between the two platforms. According to the 1914 Ordnance Survey plan of the site, there was a two-road engine shed (which measured 136 feet by 40 feet) and a turntable to the west of the station, and goods facilities to the east.

The station was not well sited, in that passengers wishing to continue a journey beyond Norwich had to transfer to Thorpe station. On 8 September 1851 a link opened from the EUR line to the Norwich-to-Ely line, and most Ipswich services then used Thorpe station, Victoria being left with four or five trains each day.

The EUR was taken over by the Eastern Counties Railway (ECR) in 1854. However, by the 1860s the railways in East Anglia were in financial trouble, and most were leased to the ECR. It wished to amalgamate formally but could not obtain government agreement for this until 1862, when the Great Eastern Railway (GER) was formed by the amalgamation. Thus Norwich Thorpe and Norwich Victoria became GER stations in 1862.

Closure
The station was closed to passenger traffic in 1916, but was converted for goods traffic whilst coal was still handled in the adjacent yard.

The engine shed and turntable had been removed by 1926.

The station buildings were largely demolished after the Second World War, and were finally removed in February 1953.

Victoria played a significant role in handling goods traffic in the city. The table below shows the tonnages handled by the four Norwich stations in a 12-week period ending in October 1958.

The station closed to goods in 1966; at that time the adjacent coal yard was modernised, becoming a coal concentration depot. Traffic was generally worked by Class 03 or Class 08 shunters from the main station at Norwich until closure of the line in September 1986.

The coal depot site is now occupied by a Sainsbury's store, and the main station site is occupied by the Norwich offices of Marsh. Most of the buildings disappeared long ago; the trackbed has been converted into a footpath known as Lakenham Way, for use by pedestrians and cyclists.

See also
 Norwich Thorpe railway station
 Norwich City railway station

References

External links
 Norwich Victoria station (black nearest map centre) on navigable 1946 O. S. map
 Photograph of the former circus building in use as the station booking hall

Disused railway stations in Norfolk
Former Great Eastern Railway stations
Railway stations in Great Britain opened in 1849
Railway stations in Great Britain closed in 1966
1849 establishments in England
Transport in Norwich
Buildings and structures in Norwich